The Diocese of Wichita is a Latin Catholic ecclesiastical territory or diocese of the Catholic Church in Kansas.  It covers Allen, Bourbon, Butler, Chase, Chautauqua, Cherokee, Cowley, Crawford, Elk, Greenwood, Harper, Harvey, Kingman, Labette, Marion, McPherson, Montgomery, Morris, Neosho, Reno, Rice, Sedgwick, Sumner, Wilson, and Woodson counties in south central and southeast Kansas.  The diocese is home to 112,549 Catholics in 90 parishes.  The Diocese of Wichita is a suffragan diocese in the ecclesiastical province of the metropolitan Archdiocese of Kansas City in Kansas.

History
The first resident pastor within the area now known as the Diocese of Wichita was appointed in 1873. The Vicariate of Kansas came to an end when the Diocese of Leavenworth, covering the entire state, was established in 1877, with Bishop Fink as first bishop. Kansas grew so rapidly over the next ten years that Bishop Fink petitioned the Pope to establish two new Sees in Kansas, one at Wichita and the other at Concordia. The petition having been granted, in 1887 the western two-thirds of the state was divided equally in half. The north became the Diocese of Concordia and the south became the Diocese of Wichita. Reverend James O'Reilly, pastor in Topeka, Kansas, was appointed the first bishop of Wichita. However, he became ill and died before being consecrated, leaving the new diocese without a bishop for a year.

In 1888, Reverend John J. Hennessy, pastor in St. Louis, Missouri, was appointed Bishop of Wichita. Bishop Hennessy found a struggling new diocese, missionary in nature. The first census in 1889 gave the Catholic population as 8,000, with 16 priests. Bishop Hennessy was Bishop of Wichita for 32 years. Because of the small number of Catholics in the diocese, the Holy See eventually added nine counties in southeast Kansas to the Diocese of Wichita.

Within the first couple of decades of the 1900s the Catholic population reached 32,000 parishioners, and 97 parishes had been constructed, most with schools. Bishop Hennessy built a new Cathedral, honoring Our Lady of the Immaculate Conception, which was dedicated in September 1912, the jubilee year of the diocese. In 1951 the western part of the Diocese of Wichita was split off and a new Diocese of Dodge City was formed, which left the Diocese of Wichita with its present boundaries.

In February 2019, it was announced that the Kansas Bureau of Investigation (KBI) had been investigating sex abuse allegations against all Catholic dioceses in the state of Kansas, which includes the Diocese of Wichita, since November 2018. On August 14, 2020, Melissa Underwood, spokeswoman for the KBI, stated in an email "As of Aug. 7, we have had 205 reports of abuse and have opened 120 cases."

The Diocese of Wichita has a section on the main page of its website, under the heading, "Promise to Protect/Pledge to Heal", in which the bishop expresses commitment to address all allegations of sexual abuse of minors. "Virtus Training" is required/mandatory for all diocesan volunteers. According to the Diocese of Wichita, "Members of the clergy, religious, employees and each volunteer who has regular contact with a minor is required to attend a live awareness session called Protecting God’s Children for Adults. This session, provided by certified VIRTUS Facilitators, gives participants an awareness of the signs of child sexual abuse, the methods and means by which abusers commit abuse and 5 concrete steps to create safe environments and to prevent abuse."

Bishops

Bishops of Wichita
 James O'Reilly (1887); did not take effect, because of his death
 John Joseph Hennessy (1888–1920)
 Augustus John Schwertner (1921–1939)
 Christian Herman Winkelmann (1939–1946)
 Mark Kenny Carroll (1947–1967)  - Leo Christopher Byrne (coadjutor bishop 1961–1967), appointed Coadjutor Archbishop of Saint Paul and Minneapolis before succession
 David Monas Maloney (1967–1982)
 Eugene John Gerber (1982–2001)
 Thomas J. Olmsted (2001–2003), appointed Bishop of Phoenix
 Michael Owen Jackels (2005–2013), appointed Archbishop of Dubuque
 Carl A. Kemme (2014–present)

Other priests of the diocese who became bishops
John Henry Tihen, appointed Bishop of Lincoln in 1911 and later Bishop of Denver in 1917
Ignatius Jerome Strecker, appointed Bishop of Springfield-Cape Girardeau  in 1962 and later Archbishop of Kansas City in Kansas in 1969
Eugene John Gerber, appointed Bishop of Dodge City in 1976 and later returned to this diocese as Bishop of Wichita in 1982
Ronald Michael Gilmore, appointed Bishop of Dodge City in 1998
Paul Stagg Coakley, appointed Bishop of Salina in 2004 and later Archbishop of Oklahoma City in 2010
James Douglas Conley, appointed Auxiliary Bishop of Denver in 2008 and later Bishop of Lincoln in 2012
John Balthasar Brungardt, appointed Bishop of Dodge City in 2010
Shawn McKnight, appointed Bishop of Jefferson City in 2017

Notable people
Emil Kapaun (1916–1951), Roman Catholic priest, Army chaplain, Medal of Honor recipient, and candidate for canonization

Education
The Catholic Diocese of Wichita was cited by Fordham Institute as one of six best examples in the United States because of being the only diocesan school system in the country where every grade school and high school is financed by parish stewardship, rather than tuition, for active parish families. In addition, parishes and dioceses across the United States travel to Wichita to study the success of the diocesan Catholic schools.

The diocese has four Catholic high schools, commonly known as secondary schools. Three of the schools are wholly controlled by the diocese; one is a parochial high school. All are supported chiefly through the stewardship of the parishioners. Three of the four high school facilities have been expanded in the last seven years.

The diocese has thirty-four grade schools, often referred to as elementary or primary schools. Twenty-seven of these schools also contain grades 6-8, sometimes called middle school. All Elementary schools shown below cover grades Pre-K to 8th grade.

High schools 
Bishop Carroll Catholic High School, Wichita
Kapaun Mt. Carmel High School, Wichita
St. Mary's-Colgan High School, Pittsburg
Trinity Catholic High School, Hutchinson

See also

 Catholic Church by country
 Catholic Church hierarchy
 List of the Catholic dioceses of the United States

References

External links

Roman Catholic Diocese of Wichita Official Site

 
Roman Catholic Ecclesiastical Province of Kansas City
Wichita
Culture of Wichita, Kansas
Wichita
Diocese of Wichita
Wichita
1887 establishments in Kansas